"Adentro Cojutepeque" is a song written and composed in 1942 by Salvadoran singer-composer Francisco Palaviccini, creator of Salvadoran genre xuc. It was composed for the Cojutepeque's Cain Sugar Celebration (Fiestas de la Caña de Azúcar).

This song was released during the patron saint festivities of Cojutepeque, held in January 1958. The song was performed by Orquesta Internacional Polío, with Palaviccini as its conductor. "Adentro Cojutepeque" has become a cultural reference for El Salvador since it was the first xuc song composed. This version, with Gil Medinas's voice, is widely recognized as part of the popular music of El Salvador.

The song was recorded and included in his 1962 album El Xuc.

Background 
Cojutepeque had been chosen as the provisional capital between 1854 and 1858, due to the earthquake of April 16, 1854, that destroyed the city of San Salvador. This caused an increase in political activity in that town, since between 1856 and 1857 the population of Cojutepeque left Nicaragua with the Salvadoran army to support the campaign against William Walker, which would be called the Central American National War. When Francisco Palaviccini visited Cojutepeque, he was amazed for its history, and it inspired him to compose his first xuc, "Adentro Cojutepeque".

Personnel 
Credits adapted from El Xuc liner notes.

 Gil Medina: lead vocals
 José Max Cañas: saxophone
 Julio C. Tario: saxophone
 Francisco Palaviccini: alto saxophone
 Alberto Ramos: saxophone
 Antonio Linares: baritone saxophone
 Efraín García: trumpet
 Luis Cáceres: trumpet
 Orlando Rivera: trumpet
 Emigdio Alfaro: trombone
 Héctor Lucero: trombone
 Raúl Portillo: piano
 Francisco Santos: bass
 Ricardo Loza: drums
 Meme Aguilar: tumbadoras

References

External links
Lyrics of this song at Musixmatch

1942 songs
1962 singles